Haitao is a given name of Chinese origin that is principally used as a masculine name. It may refer to:

Du Haitao (born 1987), Chinese television presenter
Fu Haitao (born 1993), Chinese triple jumper
Hao Haitao (born 1968), Chinese soccer coach
Liu Haitao (born 1983), Chinese sprint canoer
Qiu Haitao (born 1973), Chinese female softball player
Zhang Haitao (born 1970), Chinese soccer coach

Chinese masculine given names